Cadet College Kohat  is one of the Elite Institutions of Pakistan which Provides quality education to all segments of society on merit and competition grade 8th to 12th. The college is located on the outskirts of Kohat, Pakistan.

History
In Pakistan, Cadet Colleges were introduced by late Field Marshal, Muhammad Ayub Khan and these were established at Hasanabdal, Kohat and Petaro.

In pursuance of the recommendations of the Commission on National Education of the defunct Government of West Pakistan decided to establish another Cadet College to be the third in the province.

In recognition of the military services of the people of the area, Mr. Fateh Khan Bandial, the then Deputy Commissioner, Kohat, requested late Malik Amir Muhammad Khan, H.Pk, H.Q.A., the then Governor of West Pakistan that a Cadet College should be established at Kohat. Mr Fateh Khan acquired  of land for the college. The foundation-stone was laid by late Malik Amir M. Khan, on 19 April 1964.

The first entry of cadets was accepted in April 1965. Academic work started with 58 cadets and one boarding house called Jinnah House. Lt. Col. (Retd.) Faizullah Khattak (late) was its founding Principal.

Admin block
Cadet College Kohat has a large body of administration. This body of administration has its offices in Admin Block. Adjacent to admin block is the Principal's office. Admin Block has the following offices:
 Vice Principal
 Director of Studies
 Controller of Examination
 Adjutant
 Deputy Director of Finance

Board of governors

Members of the board of governors  were:

 Patron-in-Chief: Chief Minister Khyber Pakhtunkhwa
 GOC 9 Division, Kohat - Chairman
 Kohatian - Member
 General (RETD) Salah Ud Din, Ex-Cadet - Member
 Base Commander, PAF Base, Kohat - Member 
 Director HRD, GHQ, Rawalpindi - Member     
 Director Naval Educational Services, NHQ, Islamabad - Member     
 Secretary Finance KPK, Peshawar - Member
 Secretary Schools & Literacy NWFP - Member
 Deputy Commissioner, Kohat - Member 
 Principal Cadet College Kohat - Secretary

Academic block
Cadet College Kohat has double story academic block. Academic Block consists of classrooms, assembly hall (Faizullah Khan Auditorium), Chemistry laboratory, Physics Laboratory (Dr. A. Q. Khan Laboratory), Biology Laboratory and Language Lab. It also has a staff room.

Multimedia block
It houses Khursheed digital library, a computer lab, an audio-visual lab and various break out rooms for e-learning activities.

Infrastructure

The buildings comprise an Academic Block, Admin Block, Multimedia block, seven boarding houses (spread around the Academic Block in a semicircular shape), three messes, a mosque, a gymnasium, a cafeteria, a swimming pool, a ten-bed hospital, several sports fields including nine football grounds, seven hockey fields, two cricket pitches, six basketball courts, three volleyball courts and two squash courts. The college has residential accommodation for the teaching and administrative staff.

Library
Cadet College Kohat has a rich collection of books in its library named "Khursheed Library"; named after then Principal, Mirza Khurshid Anwar Beg. Under the supervision of a qualified Librarian, the library is providing services to 542 Cadets and 230 College employees. Total Collection of the library is 30,000 books, including Islamic, Reference, Computer, History, Science and Arts Books. Similarly to provide the latest information and to improve the English language of the Cadets, English & Urdu magazines, Journals, Digests, Newspapers etc., of National and International level have also been subscribed for the library. An audio-visual library has been set up with the latest equipment to acquaint the cadets with modern techniques of learning.

Mosque
The college has a spacious and beautiful mosque. It has recently been renovated. More than 1000 people can pray/accommodate in Masjid Hall.

Hospital
The college has a twenty-bed hospital along with two isolation rooms for special cases. A full-time medical officer assisted by two dispensers look after the health of cadets. The college hospital has its own ambulance. Cadets are referred to C.M.H. Kohat for medical treatment as well. Dr Rizwan Khan is currently the senior medical officer of College Hospital.
Who is assisted by two Medical assistants who are well qualified in taking care of the cadets Health.

Messes / Dining Halls
There are three messes catering for the needs of cadets. The Messing Officer supervises the working of messes. The Caterer looks after the procurement and supply of dry and fresh provisions. Every effort is made to provide a balanced and nutritious diet with several fruits. Meals include breakfast, milk during breakfast, refreshment during break, lunch, evening tea and dinner. Recently Dining Hall has been extended.

Notable alumni
 Five alumni of cadet college kohat have won sword of honour at Pakistan Military Academy(PMA) Kakul, Pakistan Air force Academy(PAF) Risalpur and Pakistan Naval Academy(PNA) Manora
 More than 30 alumni have embraced shahadat while serving in defence and civil forces.
 Asif Sandila, Chief of Naval Staff
 Vice Admiral (R) Tehseen Ullah
 Rear Admiral Ahmed Fauzan 
 Commodore(R) Mahmood Ur Rehman
 Air Vice Marshal Ahmed Hassan, Deputy Chief of Air Staff, Engineering (DCAS-E), AHQ 
 Maj General Rtd Zafarullah GOC Panu Aqil 
 Group Capt. (Retd) Abdul Hameed Qureshi
 Lt Gen. (Retd) Sabahat Hussain
 Maj Gen. (Late) Javed Sultan
 Maj Gen. (Retd) Haroon Pasha
 Maj Gen. (Retd) Salahuddin, Army Medical Corps
Maj Gen. Zahid Khan
Maj Gen. Shakir Ullah Khattak
Maj Gen. Ahsan Khattak
Maj Gen. Zafar Iqbal Marwat
Brig Akhtar Subhan (Engineer)
 Brig Dr. Zaffar Khan Khattak (Army Medical Corps)
 Brig Mushtaq
 Senator Anwaar Ul Haq Kakar 
 Shibli Faraz, Former Senator and district mayor of Kohat
 Malik Muhammad Asad Khan, former District Nazim Kohat and former chairman board of directors Peshawar Electric Supply Company(PESCO)
 Atif Khan, education minister KPK/Muhammad_Atif_(politician)
 Hamayun Khan, EX-Finance Minister KP
 Brig(retd) Gulistan Janjua, Ex-Governor KPK
 Engr. Shaukatullah Khan, Ex-Governor KPK 
 Iqbal Zafar Jhagra, Governor KPK
 Ihsan Ghani, former Inspector General KPK and chairman NACTA
 Tariq Masood Yasin, former Inspector General of the Islamabad Police and additional Inspector General(training) Punjab police 
 Khalid Khattak, former Inspector General of the Islamabad Police
 Deputy Inspector General of Police Malik Muhammad Saad Khan Shaheed
 Inam Ghani, former IGP Punjab.
 Sajjad Khan Bangash, SSP(operations) Peshawar
Muhammad Wasif Saeed, Political Agent Mohmand 
 Yasir Afridi, SSP(traffic) Peshawar
 Asif Bahadar, ASP Sindh police
 Muhammad Azhar, ASP Islamabad police
 Ikram Ghani, Chief Commissioner Income Tax KPK 
 Shahzad Bangash (Former Secretary Education KPK)
 Yasir Qayyum (Deputy Secretary Education, KPK)
 Shakil Qadir (Finance Secretary KPK) 
 Dr. Muhammad Ayub Roz (Former Director general health services KPK) 
 Mr. Zulfiqar Ahmad, Former Director General National Commission for Human Development (NCHD), Former Chief Executive Officer Pakistan Human Development Fund (PHDF), Former Managing Director ESEF, KPK and Chairman Board of Directors, Peshawar Electric Supply Company (PESCO)
 Prof Dr. Arshad Javaid, vice chancellor khyber medical university
 Shahid Khan, Global director (SAP) US
 Major General Shahid Hameed, AMC, Plastic Surgeon
 Brig (R) Wajid Qayum Paracha, Principal, Karnal Sher Khan Shaheed Cadet College Swabi

College anthem
Famous Poet Ahmad Faraz has written the College Anthem that is sung only in the Thursday morning assembly.

See also
 Army Burn Hall College
 Military College Jhelum
 PAF Public School Sargodha
 PAF Public School Lower Topa
 Garrison Cadet College Kohat
 Cadet College Petaro
 Cadet College Hasan Abdal

References

External links

Cadet colleges in Pakistan
Boarding schools in Pakistan
Kohat District
Educational institutions established in 1965
1965 establishments in Pakistan
Public universities and colleges in Khyber Pakhtunkhwa
Cadet College Kohat